The 2013 I-League 2nd Division Final Round is the sixth Final Round of the I-League 2nd Division. The tournament began after the group stage was completed on 26 March 2013.

Format
The Final Round of the 2013 I-League 2nd Division is taking place between six teams from the group stage.

Qualification

Final round table

Fixtures and results

First leg

Match Day 1

Match Day 2 
Tuesday, 2 April 2013

Wednesday, 3 April 2013

Match Day 3 
Friday, 5 April 2013

Saturday, 6 April 2013

Match Day 4 
Monday, 8 April 2013

Tuesday, 9 April 2013

Match Day 5 
Thursday, 11 April 2013

Friday, 12 April 2013

Second leg

Match Day 1 
Monday, 15 April 2013

Tuesday, 16 April 2013

Match Day 2 
Thursday, 18 April 2013

Friday, 19 April 2013

Match Day 3 
Sunday, 21 April 2013

Monday, 22 April 2013

Match Day 4 
Wednesday, 24 April 2013

Thursday, 25 April 2013

Match Day 5 
Saturday, 27 April 2013

Sunday, 28 April 2013

Top scorers

References

I-League 2nd Division final rounds
2012–13 in Indian football